Percy David Coffin (b 1953) is the former Anglican Archbishop of the Diocese of Western Newfoundland, Canada.

Coffin was born in Joe Batt's Arm and educated at the Memorial University of Newfoundland.

References

1953 births
Anglican bishops of Western Newfoundland
21st-century Anglican Church of Canada bishops
Living people
People from Newfoundland (island)
Memorial University of Newfoundland alumni